Seema Zia is a Pakistani politician who had been a Member of the Provincial Assembly of Sindh from June 2013 to May 2018.

Early life and education 
She was born on 17 January 1966.

She has earned the degree of Bachelor of Medicine and Bachelor of Surgery from Khyber Medical College.

Political career

She was elected to the Provincial Assembly of Sindh as a candidate of Pakistan Tehreek-e-Insaf (PTI) on a reserved seat for women in 2013 Pakistani general election.

She was re-elected to the Provincial Assembly of Sindh as a candidate of PTI on a reserved seat for women in 2018 Pakistani general election.

References

Living people
21st-century Pakistani women politicians
Sindh MPAs 2013–2018
Women members of the Provincial Assembly of Sindh
1966 births
Pakistan Tehreek-e-Insaf politicians